St. Lawrence Spurs Football Club is a Maltese football club from the town of San Lawrenz, Gozo. The club was founded in 1968. They currently play in the Gozo Football League Second Division.

History 
St. Lawrence Spurs was established in 1968 and took part in three successive seasons which are 1968/69, 1969/70, 1970/71. After having participated in those seasons, the team had to stop because many players have migrated to Australia.

In 1985, the team has been established over time along with the village of Għarb and took part in the 1985/86 season. The years following Għarb have formed their own team which was Għarb Rangers F.C. This led to a renaissance of St. Lawrence Spurs as an independent team.

From the 1986/1987 season, St. Lawrence Spurs always competed in the tournament organized by the GFA, these years were years of disappointment, success and also hard work.

Current squad

Honors 
Second Division Gozo:
 Runners-up (2) : 1999-00, 2003-04
Second Division Cup:
 Winners (1) : 1992-93 2018-2019
 Runners-up (5) : 1989-90, 1993-94, 2001-02, 2005-06, 2012-13

References

External links
 St. Lawrence Spurs Official Website

Football clubs in Malta
Gozitan football clubs
Association football clubs established in 1968
1968 establishments in Malta
San Lawrenz